General elections are scheduled to be held in Gabon in 2023. Incumbent President Ali Bongo Ondimba is running for re-election.

Background 

The presidential election was last time held on 27 August 2016. On the day after the elections, opposition leader Jean Ping declared victory and said that he was "waiting for the outgoing president to call to congratulate me", although no results had been officially announced. Only the electoral commission was legally permitted to announce results, and the Minister of the Interior, Pacôme Moubelet-Boubeya, accused Ping of "attempt[ing] to manipulate the democratic process", while Bongo said that "you must not sell the skin of the bear before you've killed him". Nevertheless, Bongo's spokesman, Alain Claude Bilie By Nzé, asserted that Bongo was ahead and would be re-elected. Official results were scheduled to be announced on 30 August, but on that date it was stated that the announcement would be delayed by a few hours. Results were finally announced on 31 August, showing a narrow victory for Bongo, who won 49.8% of the vote against 48.2% for Ping. Turnout was placed at 59.5%. The opposition's representatives on the electoral commission refused to confirm the results, and they were therefore confirmed by a vote in which the opposition members abstained. Ping's supporters maintained that the mostly complete results they had independently collected showed their candidate beating Bongo by a large margin, 59% to 38%. Notably, the official results from Haut-Ogooue (the Bongo family's native province) showed Bongo receiving 95.5% of the vote on an alleged 99.9% turnout, an impossible result sparking widespread protests. Bongo, noting that the vote was close, stressed the importance of peacefully respecting this outcome.

Following the announcement of official results, protests broke out in Libreville on 31 August, with attempts made to storm the election commission's offices. Police were out in force and tried to disperse the protesters. The Parliament building was set on fire later in the day. The following day, Ping claimed that the presidential guard had bombed his party's headquarters, killing two people. By 2 September at least five people had been killed in the capital and 1,000 more has been arrested. The United Nations expressed "deep concern" about the violence. Along with France and the United States, it called for de-escalation on both sides of the dispute and pressed for more transparent detail on the vote outcome.

Opposition call for fair elections 
On 12 December, the entire Gabonese opposition gathered in Libreville for the start of a series of meetings in view of the presidential and legislative election of 2023. This meeting, at the call of the National Union, brought together  fifty parties, including civil society leaders. The meeting was meant to put pressure on the government to reform the electoral process, and remind the public authorities of the need for consultation with the opposition. For Paulette Missambo, president of U'N, there is urgency to reform in order to have a fair election in place.

Electoral system 
The President of Gabon is elected for a seven-year term in a single round of voting by plurality; whichever candidate places first is deemed elected, regardless of whether the candidate secured an absolute majority of votes. This system is thought to be a disadvantage to the fractious opposition, which would appear to have little chance of winning unless it unites behind a single candidate.

The 143 members of the National Assembly are elected from single-member constituencies using the two-round system.

Candidates 
Incumbent President confirmed Ali Bongo Ondimba is running for re-election. 

Gabonese authorities hauled into prison Sosthene Orphee Lendjedi Ibola, a candidate for the presidential election, on terrorism charges. The leader of  New Orientation, was arrested on November 10 2022 in capital Libreville and sent to prison on November 15.

References

Gabon
Presidential
Presidential elections in Gabon